York Island may refer to:

 New York Island (Manhattan)
 York Island (Antigua and Barbuda)
 York Island (Queensland)
 York Island (Sierra Leone)
 York Island (Wisconsin)
 York Island (Garfield County, Montana) in Garfield County, Montana
 York Island (British Columbia) in British Columbia, Canada

See also 
 Yorks Islands (Montana) in Broadwater County, Montana